The Sticky Fingers of Time is a 1997 American science fiction film directed by Hilary Brougher and starring Terumi Matthews, Nicole Zaray, Belinda Becker, James Urbaniak and Samantha Buck. It premiered on September 9, 1997 at the 22nd Toronto International Film Festival in the Discovery programme section.

External links 
 

1997 films
1997 science fiction films
LGBT-related science fiction films
1997 LGBT-related films
1990s English-language films